Saliya Saman (born 25 November 1985) is a Sri Lankan first-class cricketer who plays for Chilaw Marians Cricket Club. He made his Twenty20 debut on 17 August 2004, for Galle Cricket Club in the 2004 SLC Twenty20 Tournament.

See also
 List of Chilaw Marians Cricket Club players

References

External links
 

1985 births
Living people
Sri Lankan cricketers
Ampara District cricketers
Galle Cricket Club cricketers
Chilaw Marians Cricket Club cricketers
Kandy Crusaders cricketers